This is a listing of the most important television appearances by the entertainer Bing Crosby.

Background
Somewhat reluctantly, in 1954, Bing Crosby had started making television appearances, which were usually filmed in advance. He had been concerned about over-exposure, saying, "I do think this: anybody who goes into TV should be sparing in how much work he does. No entertainer who's in everyone's home once a week can survive very long. His welcome can't be stretched that far. If a new motion picture of mine were released each week for fifty-two weeks—or even for thirty-nine weeks—I soon wouldn't have many friends coming to the theaters to see me. And they'd drop the flap on me at home, too. They'd weary of my mannerisms, my voice, my face."

In 1954, Crosby's radio show had reduced in status from a major weekly program to a daily fifteen-minute show, but after the success of the film High Society and hit records such as "True Love" and "Around the World," he was tempted to become more heavily involved in television. The big breakthrough came in 1957 with the live, award-winning "Edsel Show." Afterwards, he settled into a routine of making at least two television specials each year, but he never really attempted to dominate the sector as he had other media. He eschewed a weekly variety series while singers such as Perry Como, and later, Andy Williams, embraced such exposure enthusiastically, with considerable benefits accruing to their record sales and to their long-term images.

Crosby was especially closely associated with ABC's variety show The Hollywood Palace. He was the show's first and most frequent guest host, and appeared annually on its Christmas edition with his wife Kathryn and his younger children. The coverage of his annual golf tournament gave him regular exposure as did his appearances on The American Sportsman program. He did try his hand with a weekly sit-com series in 1964-65, but this was not renewed after the first season. 

Crosby's last TV appearance was a Christmas special filmed in London in September 1977 and aired just weeks after his death. It was on this special that Crosby recorded a duet of "The Little Drummer Boy" and "Peace on Earth" with rock star David Bowie. It was released in 1982 as a single 45-rpm record and reached No.3 in the UK singles charts. It has since become a staple of holiday radio, and the final popular hit of Crosby's career. At the end of the century, TV Guide listed the Crosby–Bowie duet as one of the 25 most memorable musical moments of 20th-century television.

Crosby's main television appearances as host

Significant guest appearances

References

External links
 Bing Crosby Official Website
 BING magazine

Television appearances